Rob & Chyna is an American reality television series starring Rob Kardashian and Blac Chyna. The seven-part one-hour series premiered on September 11, 2016, on the E! cable network.

Production 

The reality series was greenlit on June 1, 2016. Rob & Chyna follows the relationship of Rob Kardashian and Blac Chyna as they prepare to welcome their first child. Six hour-long episodes were ordered, excluding a television special featuring the birth of Kardashian and Chyna's newborn. The show premiered on September 11, 2016. Jeff Olde, an executive vice president of the network, explained the reasons of giving Kardashian and Chyna their own series:

The series airs on E!, an American cable network which features mostly entertainment-related programming, and reality television series, including Keeping Up with the Kardashians, another series that both Rob Kardashian and Blac Chyna have been part of. The show is produced by Bunim/Murray Productions and Ryan Seacrest Productions, which also produce Keeping Up with the Kardashians.

Fate
On December 14, 2016, E! renewed the series for a second season consisting of eight episodes that was expected to premiere in 2017. In July 2017, E! confirmed the series was put on hold, and not on their current schedule.

Episodes

Reception 
Dave Schilling, writing for The Guardian, panned the show by describing it as "painfully dull" and "astoundingly depressing". Bethonie Butler of The Washington Post noted its similarities to other shows featuring the Kardashian family, and said: "Aside from a comic book-esque visual effect that was used to transition scenes [...], Rob & Chyna is very much like the show that made the Kardashian family a household name".

References

External links 
 
 

2010s American reality television series
2016 American television series debuts
2016 American television series endings
English-language television shows
Television series by Bunim/Murray Productions
Television series by Ryan Seacrest Productions
Keeping Up with the Kardashians
Reality television spin-offs
E! original programming
Television shows related to the Kardashian–Jenner family
American television spin-offs